Wilson Eduardo Álvarez Fuenmayor (born March 24, 1970) is a Venezuelan former professional baseball player. He played in Major League Baseball as a left-handed pitcher. During a thirteen-year baseball career, he pitched for the Texas Rangers, Chicago White Sox, San Francisco Giants, Tampa Bay Devil Rays, and Los Angeles Dodgers.

Career
Born in Maracaibo, Venezuela, Alvarez represented his hometown in the 1982 Little League World Series, where they finished with a 2–1 record. Alvarez began his professional baseball career when he was signed by the Texas Rangers as an amateur free agent on September 23, 1986. He made his major league debut at the age of nineteen on July 24, 1989, the first player born in the 1970s to make their debut. Five days later, he was traded with Scott Fletcher and Sammy Sosa to the Chicago White Sox for Harold Baines and Fred Manrique. Alvarez provided one of the highlights of the 1991 Chicago White Sox season on August 11, pitching a no-hitter against the Baltimore Orioles at Memorial Stadium in only his second Major League start. It was quite a contrast to his only previous appearance, when he faced five batters for the Rangers and gave up two walks, a single and two home runs without retiring a batter, giving him an undefined career ERA prior to his no-hit gem.

Alvarez had control problems in the minors, and it carried over to the big leagues. After shouldering a very heavy workload in 1991, he was kept under scrutiny for most of the  season. Between the majors, minors and winter league action, Alvarez worked close to 300 innings in '91; a significant number for anyone, but especially for a 21-year-old pitcher. It wasn't until  that he managed to break into the rotation permanently. That season, Alvarez won 15 games and finished second in the league in earned run average, but his control problems continued; he led the league with 122 walks.

In , Alvarez went 12–8 and made the American League All-Star team.

During the  season, the White Sox traded Álvarez, Danny Darwin, and Roberto Hernández to the San Francisco Giants for six prospects (Keith Foulke, Bob Howry, Lorenzo Barceló, Mike Caruso, Ken Vining, and Brian Manning) in what became known as the White Flag Trade. A free agent after the season, he signed a five-year contract with Tampa Bay. He was the team's first pitcher, and started Opening Day on March 31, 1998, throwing the Devil Rays' first ever pitch (a ball to Detroit's Brian L. Hunter).

Inconsistency and poor conditioning continually kept him from realizing his full potential. In his first season with the Devil Rays, Alvarez missed two months with tendinitis in his shoulder, eventually losing 14 games during the season. The following year he made two trips to the disabled list. Finally, he had arthroscopic shoulder surgery and missed the next two seasons. After finishing his contract with Tampa Bay, Álvarez signed with the Dodgers. He began the 2003 season as a starter for Triple-A Las Vegas. After going 5–1 with a 1.15 ERA, he filled the long relief role for the Dodgers at mid-season. Later he got a chance to start, collecting a 5–0 record and 1.06 ERA over a stretch of nine games. In 2004, he went 7–6 in 40 games (15 as a starter).

On August 1, 2005, Alvarez announced he would retire after the season.  He compiled a career 102–92 record with 1330 strikeouts and a 3.96 ERA in 1747.2 innings.

After a brief stint as the pitching coach of the State College Spikes (2007–2008), Álvarez joined the Baltimore Orioles organization when he was named pitching coach of the Gulf Coast League Orioles in 2013. He was dismissed from that job in June 2019.

In 2010, Álvarez gained induction into the Caribbean Baseball Hall of Fame.

Personal life
He is the father of Viviana, Vannessa, and Valentina Alvarez, and currently lives in Florida.

See also
 List of Major League Baseball no-hitters
 List of Major League Baseball single-inning strikeout leaders
 List of Major League Baseball players from Venezuela

References

External links

 Box Score of Wilson Álvarez's No Hitter
The ESPN Baseball Encyclopedia – Gary Gillette, Peter Gammons, Pete Palmer. Publisher: Sterling Publishing, 2005. Format: Paperback, 1824pp. 

1970 births
Living people
Águilas del Zulia players
American League All-Stars
Birmingham Barons players
Charlotte Rangers players
Chicago White Sox players
Durham Bulls players
Gastonia Rangers players
Gulf Coast Devil Rays players
Gulf Coast Rangers players
Las Vegas 51s players
Los Angeles Dodgers players
Major League Baseball pitchers
Major League Baseball players from Venezuela
Minor league baseball coaches
Nashville Sounds players
Oklahoma City 89ers players
Orlando Rays players
San Francisco Giants players
Sportspeople from Maracaibo
St. Petersburg Devil Rays players
Tampa Bay Devil Rays players
Texas Rangers players
Tulsa Drillers players
Vancouver Canadians players
Venezuela national baseball team people
Venezuelan baseball coaches
Venezuelan expatriate baseball players in Canada
Venezuelan expatriate baseball players in the United States